Matthias Wurm (born 3 April 1993) is an Austrian professional footballer who plays as a midfielder for Austrian 2. Landesliga club ASK Ybbs.

Club career

Early career
Wurm began his career in 1999 with the youth academy of Amstetten. He made his professional debut playing for Amstetten against Austria Wien II on 9 August 2011.

On 1 June 2021, he moved to the fifth-tier club ASK Ybbs.

References

External links 

1993 births 
Living people
Austrian footballers
Association football midfielders
SKU Amstetten players
2. Liga (Austria) players
Austrian Regionalliga players